Bruno di Girolamo is an Italian clarinetist.

Girolamo studied clarinet at the Conservatorio di Santa Cecilia in Rome. He now teaches at the Conservatorio. He performed with I Virtuosi di Roma under Renato Fasano. He uses a "Wurlitzer Boehm-reformed system" clarinet.

Discography
Donizetti: Chamber Music, with various artists. Arts, 1997.

References

Living people
Italian musicians
Italian clarinetists
Year of birth missing (living people)
Place of birth missing (living people)
21st-century clarinetists